William Meridas Meek (August 14, 1920 – May 28, 1998) was an American football player and coach. He served as the head football coach at Kansas State University (1947–1950), the University of Houston (1951–1954), Southern Methodist University (1957–1961), and the University of Utah (1968–1973), compiling a career college football record of 78–88–7.

Early life
Meek was born in Waterbury, Connecticut, to Joseph A. Meek and Josephine E. Gaudiosi. His paternal grandmother was born in Germany, while his maternal grandparents emigrated from Italy. His family moved to Birmingham, Alabama, in his youth. In college, he earned three letters playing as a back-up quarterback for the University of Tennessee; he graduated in 1943.

Coaching career
Meek had his first head coaching experience at age 22, with the Fort Benning Doughboy football club in 1944, while serving in the Army during World War II. Most of the starters on the team were members of the great Army teams of the early 1940s, and the team defeated all opponents except for a 0–7 loss to Auburn University. Marty Blake, later the NBA director of scouting, was one of the team managers. Following the war, Meek left the Army with the rank of captain.

Meek served as an assistant football coach throughout the remainder of the 1940s. From 1947 to 1950, he coached under Jim Tatum at the University of Maryland. During his tenure there, Meek was credited with the development of backs Ed Modzelewski and Bob Shemonski.

In 1951, Meek was offered his first collegiate head coaching position at Kansas State University with an initial salary of $8,000. Meek was offered the job even though he told the hiring committee at Kansas State that the program was in disarray. His first season he posted a 1–7–1 record, typical for Kansas State at the time. When he learned after the season that an ineligible player had participated, he self-reported the violation to the NCAA and the school voluntarily forfeited the win and the tie. The following season, the squad went 1–9. Meek accepted the services of several former Army players who resigned from the academy after violating the honor code in 1951. In 1953, Kansas State posted a 6–3–1 record, the first winning season at the school since Wes Fry's 1936 team. After starting that season 5–1, K-State also received its first national ranking, at #18 in the Coaches Poll on October 28, 1953. The following year was even better, with Kansas State posting a 7–3 record and playing for an Orange Bowl berth in their final game (they went on to lose at Colorado). Meek left Kansas State following the 1954 season, when the school refused to give raises to his assistants. Kansas State wouldn't have another winning record for 16 years.

In January 1955, Meek took over as the head coach at the University of Houston. In two years at Houston, from 1955 to 1956, Meek compiled a 13–6–1 record. In his second season, Meek led the Cougars to the Missouri Valley Conference championship and was named the Missouri Valley Coach of the Year.

In 1957, Meek took the job as head coach of the SMU Mustangs. During his tenure, from 1957 to 1961, he compiled a 17–29–4 record, while coaching All-American quarterback Don Meredith. By far his worst season at SMU was 1960, when his team went 0–9–1, with the only game decided by less than 10 points being a 0–0 tie with Texas A&M.

From 1962 to 1967, Meek worked as an assistant coach, including stints as Director of Pro Personnel for the Denver Broncos and as a scout for the Dallas Cowboys. Meek was offensive coordinator for Army during the 1966 and 1967 seasons.

Meek took his final coaching job in 1968, as head coach at the University of Utah in Salt Lake City. He guided the WAC team to a 33–31 record in six seasons, and his 1969 team posted an  record.

Head coaching record

References

External links
 

1920 births
1998 deaths
American football quarterbacks
Army Black Knights football coaches
Dallas Cowboys scouts
Denver Broncos executives
Houston Cougars football coaches
Maryland Terrapins football coaches
Kansas State Wildcats football coaches
SMU Mustangs football coaches
Tennessee Volunteers football players
Utah Utes football coaches
United States Army officers
United States Army personnel of World War II
Players of American football from Birmingham, Alabama
Sportspeople from Birmingham, Alabama
Sportspeople from Waterbury, Connecticut
Coaches of American football from Alabama
Players of American football from Alabama
American people of German descent
American people of Italian descent